Nicknamed the Spare-tyre nebula, IC 5148 is a planetary nebula located around 1 degree west of Lambda Gruis in the constellation of Grus (The Crane). It was discovered by Australian amateur astronomer Walter Gale in 1894. Around 3000 light-years distant, it is expanding at a rate of 50 kilometres a second, one of the fastest of all planetary nebulae.

The central star of the planetary nebula has a spectral type of hgO(H).

References

External links
 

5148
Planetary nebulae
Grus (constellation)